is a song by Brazilian singer and composer Chico Buarque, recorded in 1971 for his album of the same name.

The lyrics are in Brazilian Portuguese (with a Spanish version being released later). The song is made of 14 syllables verses and each sentence ends with a proparoxytone word. The musical arrangements are by the musician Rogério Duprat.

The song was made during one of the harshest times of the military dictatorship in Brazil, amid censorship and political persecution, soon after Buarque returned from Italy where he had previously moved to due to the threat of political persecution. In 2009, "Construção" was selected by Rolling Stone magazine as the greatest Brazilian song of all time.

The song was featured in the 2016 Summer Olympics opening ceremony in Rio de Janeiro.

Lyrics and Music
"Construção" narrates the events of the last day of a construction worker's life, who is killed in the course of his daily activities. The song tells the story from the beginning of his day until his death. Over three sections of verses (stanzas), the narrator observes, organizes and communicates the daily activities that took place in a circular narration, sung in reiterative melody and poetic structure, modifying the viewing angle in each section by changing the placement of the last word. This replacement process creates strong imageries denoting the disposable nature of labor in a cut-throat capitalistic system that dehumanizes and disempowers workers and sees as disposable commodities. All three stanzas conclude in the worker's death with different semantic impact and imagery of powerful intensity.

As stated before, the lyrics are seen as a strong critique of the alienation of the worker in a modern, urban capitalist society, reduced to a mechanical condition, especially intensified in the third stanza. When the worker eventually falls to his death, the lyrics revealing that his body "smashed on the street" is a nuisance to "the traffic," "the crowd," and "the Saturday" (of the public), respectively.

The lyrics are constructed in order to add effective pathos incrementally, building a tour de force in meaning and image piece by piece, verse by verse. The song is known for its interchangeable last word of each line, which Buarque described as being put together "as if they were pieces of a board game."

References

1971 songs
Brazilian songs
Portuguese-language songs
Chico Buarque songs
Songs about death
Protest songs